The Happy Warrior may refer to:

"Character of the Happy Warrior", an 1806 poem by Wordsworth, source of a metaphor "the happy warrior"
The Happy Warrior, an 1884 painting by George Frederic Watts
The Happy Warrior, a 1912 novel by A. S. M. Hutchinson
The Happy Warrior (1917 film), a 1917 film directed by F. Martin Thornton, based on the novel by Hutchinson
The Happy Warrior (1925 film), a 1925 American silent drama film
Al Smith (1873–1944), American politician, named "the Happy Warrior of the political battlefield" by Franklin D. Roosevelt
Hubert Humphrey (1911–1978), American politician, nicknamed "The Happy Warrior"
The Happy Warrior, a biography of Churchill in the form of a comic strip, drawn by Frank Bellamy
The Happy Warrior, a 1960 biography of West Indian cricketer Collie Smith by Ken Chaplin
Roxanne Modafferi (born 1982), American female mixed martial artist
Happy Warrior: Political Memoirs, the 1988 autobiography of Donald C. MacDonald, Canadian politician

Lists of people by nickname